Charles Shepherd (fl. 1858–1878) was an English photographer and printer who worked in India in the second half of the 19th century. His photographs include scenes of soldiers and civilians, both English and indigenous.

In 1862, Shepherd and Arthur Robertson established a photographic studio called Shepherd & Robertson in Agra. The firm moved to Simla in 1864, at which point Samuel Bourne joined the business to work as principal photographer. At about this time, the firm changed its name to Howard, Shepherd & Bourne, and after the departure of Howard it became Bourne & Shepherd around 1868. Shepherd and Bourne opened a second branch in Calcutta (now Kolkata), where they operated a portrait studio, and their work was widely retailed throughout the subcontinent by agents and in Britain through wholesale distributors.

Bourne returned to England in 1870, but the firm continued under the Bourne & Shepherd name. He was replaced as head photographer in 1872 by Colin Murray.

Shepherd, who had primarily worked as the printer for his firms, finally left Bourne & Shepherd in 1885. Bourne & Shepherd continues to operate in Kolkata.

Works

References

Union List of Artist Names, s.v. "Shepherd, Charles". Accessed 4 December 2006.
Falconer, John (2001), India: pioneering photographers 1850-1900, London: The British Library.
Bourne & Shepherd (floruit 1865-) - Catalogue of Images National Portrait Gallery
Lenman, Robin (ed.) 2005 The Oxford Companion to the Photograph (Oxford: Oxford University Press)  [Includes a short biography on Bourne & Shepherd.]

External links

 Shepherd, Charles, fl. 1858–1878, photographer at Cambridge University Library

19th-century births
19th-century English photographers
Photography in India
Year of birth missing
Year of death missing